A New Day Cambodia (ANDC), founded in the United States in 2007, is an international relief and development organization whose goal is to provide shelter, food, and education for impoverished children in Phnom Penh, Cambodia. The board consists of four founding members, none of whom take a salary for their contributions.

History
ANDC was founded in 2006 by Bill Smith, the team photographer for the Chicago Bears, Chicago Blackhawks, Chicago Bulls and United Center. During the sporting offseason, Smith and his wife Lauren would take annual trips to Southeast Asia to photograph the changing culture and landscape. In 2002, Smith was taken to the Stung Mean Chey garbage dump by his Cambodian driver, and was stunned to see the conditions that children were living in. Children were forced to live and work in the garbage dump to provide for their families. The children, in addition to living and working in the squalor, were unable to attend school because their families needed the $10–12 a month that was provided by the children working in the dump.

Smith began to support several children that worked in these garbage dumps, enrolling the children in school and paying the families the lost monthly income, ensuring the children would never work another day in the dump.

The Smiths told their stories to family and friends, who began giving money to Smith to support additional children. In 2006, a front page article ran in the Chicago Tribune about the Smiths' work in Cambodia. After an overwhelming response of donations, Bill Smith founded A New Day Cambodia.

The charity now has two dormitories in Phnom Penh housing 99 children. The children attend English and Khmer language schooling in a day, and live at the center. All children attend private schools, with some of the most gifted students attending the most prestigious schools in Cambodia. The cost of education, activities, room and board is approximately $1800 per child each year.

In 2010, Comcast SportsNet Chicago aired a 30-minute special on ANDC and the Smiths' journey to found the centers. The entire show is available online.

Further reading 
 Dreamcatchers: A New Day, new lives- Team photographer’s story of Cambodian kids in need makes huge difference for 47 students, K.C. Johnson, Chicago Tribune, December 2007
 Chicago photographer becomes benefactor to Cambodia’s garbage dump children, Gina Bernacchi, CausePlanet.org, June 2007
 Sam Smith: Giving Cambodian children a new day Sam Smith, Bulls.com, January 2009
 We start a school in Cambodia, Nicholas D Kristof, The New York Times, December 2008
 Bill Smith- Lasting Impressions

External links
 
 Bill Smith- Lasting Impressions, Comcast SportsNet Chicago

References 

Organizations established in 2007
Children's charities based in the United States
Development charities based in the United States
Educational organizations based in the United States
Health charities in the United States
Foreign charities operating in Cambodia
Non-profit organizations based in Chicago
Hunger relief organizations
Charities based in Illinois
Medical and health organizations based in Illinois
2007 establishments in Illinois